The Guardian Angels Cathedral  also called Kitaiciho Church is the Roman Catholic cathedral of the Roman Catholic Diocese of Sapporo in the city of Sapporo, Japan. The church follows the Roman or Latin rite and serves as the seat of the Diocese, (Dioecesis Sapporensis; カトリック札幌司教区) which was raised to its current status by Pope Pius XII with the Bull "Iis Christi" in 1952.

It offers religious services in both Japanese and English and is under the pastoral responsibility of the Bishop Bernard Taiji Katsuya.

See also
Roman Catholicism in Japan
Guardian Angel Cathedral

References

Roman Catholic cathedrals in Japan
Buildings and structures in Sapporo
19th-century Roman Catholic church buildings in Japan